FIMR may refer to:

ICAO call sign for Sir Gaëtan Duval Airport
Finnish Institute of Marine Research